Franz Schubert wrote two Scherzos, D 593, for solo piano:
B major
D major
The autograph has been lost, but a manuscript copy made in the 1840s suggests that the pieces were composed in November 1817.

The second scherzo has been suggested as being a possible third movement to Schubert's Piano Sonata in D major, D 567, and its trio is identical to the trio of the minuet of the Piano Sonata in E major (itself being a transposed and revised version of the D 567 sonata).

References

External links 

Piano music by Franz Schubert
1817 compositions